Těchobuz is a municipality and village in Pelhřimov District in the Vysočina Region of the Czech Republic. It has about 70 inhabitants.

Geography
It lies in the Křemešník Highlands. There is a system of ponds, supplied by the local brook Barborka.

History
The first written mention of Těchobuz is from 1352. Between 1390 and 1431, Těchobuz was owned by the knight Albera of Stájice. Těchobuz became the centre of a small estate and the importance of the village and the local fortress grew. Other important owners of Těchobuz included the knight Václav Otta of Los, who had a belfry built here in 1603, and the Adler family, who founded a glassworks in the mid-18th century. The glassworks was closed in 1782, restored in 1798, and finally ceased to exist in 1830.

Sights
The main landmark is the Těchobuz Castle. The former fortress was completely rebuilt into this late Baroque castle in 1786–1798, later Neoclassical modifications were made. The castle also includes a farm yard and a large landscape park with ponds.

The Church of Saint Mark was first mentioned in 1338, earlier than the village of Těchobuz. It is a Baroque church with a Gothic core. Next to the church is a separate Renaissance bell tower.

The Chapel of Saint John of Nepomuk with mortuary was built in the Empire style in 1826.

Among other cultural monuments in the municipality are a Neoclassical granary from the early 19th century, Neoclassical building of the former school from 1823, and wooden barn from the turn of the 18th and 19th centuries.

Gallery

References

External links

Villages in Pelhřimov District